Founded in 1996 by World Fantasy Award winning editor Jeanne Cavelos, the Odyssey Writing Workshop is held annually on the campus of Saint Anselm College in Goffstown, New Hampshire.

Notable graduates 
C. J. Lyons, Class of 2021
Scott Gray (writer), Class of 2020
Peter Zuckerman, Class of 2019
R. F. Kuang, Class of 2016
Meagan Spooner, Class of 2009
Juliette Crane, Class of 2008
Sara King, Class of 2008 
Erin Hoffman, Class of 2005
Carl Frederick, Class of 2000
Theodora Goss, Class of 2000
 David J. Schwartz, Class of 1996 
Carrie Vaughn, Class of 1998
Lynda E. Rucker, Class of 1997

See also
 John Joseph Adams
 Terry Bisson
 Ben Bova
 David Brin
 Terry Brooks
 P. Djèlí Clark
 John Crowley
 Ellen Datlow
 Charles de Lint
 Harlan Ellison
 Elizabeth Hand
 Nina Kiriki Hoffman
 George R. R. Martin
 Patricia A. McKillip
 Brandon Sanderson
 Robert J. Sawyer
 Melissa Scott
 Nisi Shawl
 Dan Simmons
 Eric James Stone
 Sheree Thomas
 Carrie Vaughn
 Sheila Williams
 Jane Yolen
 Center for the Study of Science Fiction

References

External links 
 Official Odyssey website
 
 "Workshopping at Odyssey" article by David J. Schwartz, graduate of the class of '96

American writers' organizations
Science fiction organizations
Creative writing programs